Tine may refer to:
Tine (structural), a 'prong' on a fork or similar implement, or any similar structure
Tine (company), the biggest dairy producer in Norway
Tine (film), a 1964 Danish film
Tine, Iran, a village in Mazandaran Province, Iran
Tiné, a town in Chad near the Mourdi Depression
Tine test, a medical test for tuberculosis
Tine 2.0, an open source business software covering the software categories groupware and Customer Relationship Management
Tine (race), an alien race in the novels A Fire Upon the Deep and The Children of the Sky

Given name
 Tine Asmundsen (born 1963), Norwegian jazz musician
 Tine Baun (born 1979), Danish badminton player
 Tine Bossuyt (born 1980), Belgian Olympic swimmer
 Tine Bryld (1939–2011), Danish social worker and writer
 Tine Cederkvist (born 1979), Danish footballer
 Tine Debeljak (1903–1989), Slovenian literary critic and poet
 Tine De Caigny (born 1997), Belgian footballer
 Tine Eerlingen (born 1976), Belgian politician
 Tine Hribar (born 1941), Slovenian philosopher
 Tine Kavčič (born 1994), Slovenian footballer
 Tine Ladefoged (born 1977), Danish handball player
 Tine Logar (1916–2002), Slovenian linguist
 Tine Mena (born 1986), Indian mountaineer
 Tine Rustad Kristiansen (born 1980), Norwegian handball player
 Tine Scheuer-Larsen (born 1966), Danish Olympic tennis player
 Tine Stange (born 1986), Norwegian handball player
 Tine Sundtoft (born 1967), Norwegian politician
 Tine Susanne Miksch Roed (born 1964), Danish business executive
 Tine Thing Helseth (born 1987), a Norwegian trumpet soloist
 Tine Tollan (born 1964), Norwegian Olympic diver
 Tine van der Maas (born 1954), Argentine-South African nutritionist
 Tine Veenstra (born 1983), Dutch Olympic bobsledder
 Tine Wittler (born 1973), German writer and actress

Surname
 :fr:Augustin Tine, defence minister of Senegal
 Jacques Tiné (1914–2009), French diplomat
 Paul Tine (born 1971), North Carolina politician

See also
 
Toine